Richard Cornelius Daddario (born 1951) is an American attorney and politician. He served as the head of the New York Police Department's (NYPD) counterterrorism unit from 2010 to 2013. In December 2013, due to controversies surrounding the program's racial profiling, he resigned alongside NYPD commissioner Raymond Kelly and intelligence division head David Cohen. He was also the United States Department of Justice attache in Moscow. He is the son of Emilio Q. Daddario, a Democratic politician who represented Connecticut as a member of the 86th through 91st United States Congresses. He is also the father of actors Alexandra, Matthew and Catharine Daddario.

References

New York City Police Department officers
Georgetown University Law Center alumni
Living people
Daddario family
1951 births